Balo Raja is a Bharatiya Janata Party politician from Arunachal Pradesh. He has been elected in Arunachal Pradesh Legislative Assembly election in 2019 from Palin.

References 

Living people
Bharatiya Janata Party politicians from Arunachal Pradesh
Arunachal Pradesh MLAs 2019–2024
People from Kra Daadi district
Year of birth missing (living people)
Arunachal Pradesh MLAs 2004–2009